was a train station in Tsukigata, Kabato District, Hokkaidō, Japan.

Lines
Hokkaido Railway Company
Sasshō Line

Station layout
The station had a side platform serving one track. The station entrance was located on the south end of the platform, where the unmanned station building was also located.

Adjacent stations

History
The station opened on 1 July 1958.

In December 2018, it was announced that the station would be closed on 7 May 2020, along with the rest of the non-electrified section of the Sasshō Line. The actual last service was on 17 April 2020 amid the COVID-19 outbreak.

References

Stations of Hokkaido Railway Company
Railway stations in Hokkaido Prefecture
Railway stations in Japan opened in 1958
Railway stations closed in 2020